The Grand Basset Griffon Vendéen or GBGV is a dog breed from France.

History
The Grand Basset Griffon Vendéen is derived from the Grand Griffon. The first selections were made at the end of the 19th century by the Comte d'Elva who was looking for subjects with "straight legs". But it was Paul Dézamy who was especially responsible for fixing the type. He had understood that in order to catch a hare, dogs of a certain size were needed. He fixed the size at about 43 cm. Today used primarily when hunting with a gun, it is capable of hunting all mammalian game, from the rabbit to the wild boar. A team of Grand Bassets won the fifth edition of the European Cup for hare. The GBGV is one of six types of "basset"-type breeds recognised by the Fédération Cynologique Internationale (FCI).

Description

Appearance
Grand Basset Griffon Vendéens a long-backed, short-legged hunting breed of dog of the hound type, originating in the Vendée region of France. They are still used today to hunt boar, deer, and to track rabbit and hare, but are more commonly kept as a domestic pet.

Temperament
They are pack dogs, so owners should either spend a lot of time with them or get a second dog or a cat. They have a happy and confident personality, which can sometimes manifest itself as disobedience. With obedience training and patience, they can make great companions.

Health

Longevity
Average longevity of 76 deceased Basset Griffon Vendéens (varieties combined) in the 2004 UK Kennel Club survey was 12.1 years (maximum 17.3 years).  Leading causes of death were cancer (33%), old age (24%), and cardiac (7%).

Compared to surveyed longevities of other breeds of similar size, Basset Griffon Vendéens have a typical or somewhat higher than average life expectancy.

Among 289 live Basset Griffon Vendéens (varieties combined) in the 2004 UKC survey, the most common health issues noted by owners were reproductive, dermatologic (dermatitis and mites), and aural (otitis externa, excessive ear wax, and ear mites).

See also
 Dogs portal
 List of dog breeds
 Basset Hound
 Basset Bleu de Gascogne
 Basset Fauve de Bretagne
 Basset Artésien Normand
 Petit Basset Griffon Vendéen

References

Dog breeds originating in France
FCI breeds
Rare dog breeds
Scent hounds